East Oktibbeha County High School (EOCHS) was a public secondary school located in unincorporated Oktibbeha County, Mississippi, near Crawford. It was a part of the Oktibbeha County School District, and was formed by the consolidation of two traditionally black high schools, Moor and Alexander.

In 2015 the schools of Oktibbeha County district consolidated into the Starkville Oktibbeha Consolidated School District, and this school consolidated into Starkville High School.

As of 2016, the buildings were abandoned.

Notable alumni
April Sykes, basketball player

References

External links
 
 
 

Education in Oktibbeha County, Mississippi
Public high schools in Mississippi
2015 disestablishments in Mississippi
Educational institutions disestablished in 2015
Schools in Oktibbeha County, Mississippi